Enneapogon desvauxii is a species of grass known by the common name nineawn pappusgrass. This is a short perennial bunchgrass native to the southwestern United States, northern Mexico, parts of South America, and occurs throughout arid parts of Africa. It is known less often on other continents.

Description
Enneapogon desvauxi grows erect stems 10 to 40 centimeters tall.

It has a few hairy, thready leaves and fluffy gray inflorescences. Each spike is 3 to 6 centimeters long and contains fertile florets which form the fruit grain, each with nine spreading awns with white hairs.

References

External links
Jepson Manual Treatment — Enneapogon desvauxi
USDA Plants Profile
Enneapogon desvauxi Photo gallery

desvauxii
Bunchgrasses of North America
Bunchgrasses of South America
Grasses of Mexico
Native grasses of California
Grasses of the United States
Flora of the California desert regions
Flora of the Sonoran Deserts
North American desert flora
Flora of Northwestern Mexico
Flora of the Southwestern United States
Natural history of the Mojave Desert
Flora without expected TNC conservation status